Lithuania competed at the 2004 Summer Paralympics in Athens, Greece.

Medalists

Sports

Athletics

Men's track

Men's field

Women's track

Women's field

Goalball
The men's goalball team didn't win any medals; they were 9th out of 12 teams.

Players
Egidijus Biknevicius
Arvydas Juchna
Saulius Leonavicius
Algirdas Montvydas
Genrik Pavliukianec
Marius Zibolis

Tournament

Judo

Powerlifting

Swimming

Men

See also
Lithuania at the Paralympics
Lithuania at the 2004 Summer Olympics

External links
International Paralympic Committee

References

Nations at the 2004 Summer Paralympics
2004
Paralympics